CRIST is a shipyard, located in the Port of Gdynia, Poland.

Founded in 1990 it now mainly produces ships for the offshore industry including wind turbine installation vessels.

CRIST is a shareholder in a joint company with Bilfinger to produce foundations for offshore wind farms.

References

Shipyards of Poland
Buildings and structures in Gdynia
Manufacturing companies established in 1990
1990 establishments in Poland